Encina may refer to:


People
 Juan del Encina (1468–1529 or 1530), Spanish composer, poet and playwright
 Francisco Encina (born 1943), Chilean politician
 Francisco Antonio Encina (1874–1965), Chilean politician, businessman, political essayist, historian and white nationalist
 Guillermo Encina (born 1951), Chilean golfer
 Hernán Encina (born 1982), Argentine footballer
 Paz Encina (born 1971), Paraguayan director and screenwriter

Places
 La Encina, Castile and León, Spain, a municipality
 Encina, Oregon, United States, an unincorporated community
 Encina, original name of Uvalde, Texas, United States

Other uses
 Encina High School, Sacramento, California, United States
 Encina Power Station, a former electricity generating station in Carlsbad, California
 Encina (software), a transaction processing system

See also
 Daniel Puente Encina (born 1965), Chilean singer, songwriter, guitarist, film composer, producer and actor
 Rodrigo Ruiz Encina (born 1967), Chilean anthropologist
 Encina Tres Patas de Mendaza, a very old oak tree in Spain
 Encinas, a municipality in Spain
 Encinas (surname), a list of people